Kayah Li is a Unicode block containing characters for writing the Western and Eastern Kayah Li languages in Thailand and Burma.

History
The following Unicode-related documents record the purpose and process of defining specific characters in the Kayah Li block:

References 

Unicode blocks